Beaufortia kwongkanicola, commonly known as Lesueur beaufortia, is a plant in the myrtle family, Myrtaceae and is endemic to the southwest of Western Australia. It is a shrub with crowded leaves and large, deep purple heads of flowers in late winter and spring and is found in the northern kwongkan.

Description

The flowers are arranged in heads on the ends of the branches and have 5 sepals, 5 petals and 5 bundles of stamens. There are 5 to 7 stamens in each bundle and the free ends of the stamens separate from the bundle at different points.

Taxonomy and naming
Beaufortia kwongkanicola was first formally described in 2016 by Andrew A. Burbidge and the description was published in Nuytsia. The specific epithet ("kwongkanicola") refers to the kwongkan vegetation with which this species is found.

Distribution and habitat
Column beaufortia grows in sandy soils often over laterite and in the Lesueur sandplain region including the Avon Wheatbelt, Geraldton Sandplains and Swan Coastal Plain bioregions of south-western Western Australia.

Conservation
Beaufortia kwongkanicola  is classified as "Not Threatened" by the Western Australian Government Department of Biodiversity, Conservation and Attractions.

References

kwongkanicola
Plants described in 2016
Endemic flora of Western Australia